Qaiqsuarjuk (Inuktitut syllabics: ᖃᐃᖅᓱᐊᕐᔪᒃ) formerly Wishart Island is an uninhabited island located in the Qikiqtaaluk Region, Nunavut, Canada. It is a Baffin Island offshore island in Hudson Strait, and a member of the Sheer Islands.

Other islands in the immediate vicinity include: Lavoie Island, Poodlatee Island, Black Bluff Island, Kaavvijjuaq, Qaqqannalik, Nuvuktiqpaaraaluk, Anguttuaq, Aulatsiviit, Ijjuriktuq, Ivvitsa, Takijualuk, Kinngarjuaq, and Ungirlauttat.

References

Islands of Baffin Island
Islands of Hudson Strait
Uninhabited islands of Qikiqtaaluk Region